René Arredondo (born 15 June 1961) is a Mexican former WBC Jr. Welterweight champion.

Early life
Arredondo was born 15 June 1961 in Apatzingan, Mexico. He is the younger brother of former World Champion Ricardo Arredondo, and Roberto Arredondo who fought under the name of "Chiba Arredondo" in Japan.

Career
Arredondo turned professional in 1979. He mainly fought in Mexico for first three years, then moved the main battlefield to the United States since 1983, and won the World Boxing Council (WBC) junior welterweight title by beating Lonnie Smith via the fifth round on a technical knockout (TKO) in 1986. He lost the title in his first defense against Tsuyoshi Hamada on a first-round KO.

In 1987 he rematched Hamada and regained the title in the sixth round on a TKO. In his first defense, he again lost the title to Roger Mayweather via the sixth round on a TKO. However, Arredondo continued to fight, capturing the North American Boxing Organization (NABO) light middleweight title via the 10th-round TKO in Tijuana, Baja California in August 1995, Mexico.

Arredondo retired in 1997. He is currently working in Los Angeles at several boxing gyms, where he has a thriving personal training business. He is also married with two grown children.

See also 
 WBC Legends of Boxing Museum
 List of WBC world champions
 List of Mexican boxing world champions
 List of super lightweight boxing champions
 List of boxing families

References

External links 
 

1961 births
Living people
People from Apatzingán
Boxers from Michoacán
World boxing champions
Mexican male boxers
Welterweight boxers
Light-welterweight boxers
World light-welterweight boxing champions
World Boxing Council champions